Società Sportiva Real Montecchio is an Italian association football club located in Montecchio, frazione of Sant'Angelo in Lizzola, Marche. It currently plays in Seconda Categoria. Its colors are white and red.

Real Montecchio faced a successive relegation in 2012, 2013 and 2014, which relegated from Eccellenza Marche, Promozione, Prima Categoria to Seconda Categoria. Real Montecchio relegated from Serie D in 2010.

External links

Football clubs in Italy
Association football clubs established in 1965
Football clubs in the Marche
Italian football clubs established in 1965